Mow-way (ca. 1825–1886) (usually referred by European settlers as Shaking Hand or Hand Shaker), was the principal leader and war chief of the Kotsoteka band of the Comanche during the 1860s and 1870s, following the deaths of Kuhtsu-tiesuat (Little Buffalo) in 1864 and Tasacowadi (Big Cougar or Big Spotted Cat) in 1872.

Raiding in Mexico
In 1849-1850 a band of Kotsotekas, led by Tabe-tipu (the shaman Sunrise) and her son Tabe-tuhka (Sundown or Under-the-Sun), with his son (or younger brother) Mow-way raided Chihuahua State; the Chihuahuan Government set a bounty of 200 pesos on each Indian scalp (mostly Comanche, but Kiowa and Apache too) claiming an "extermination war" against them. In 1851 they made an agreement with the Kotsotekas, for their aid in taking Apache scalps. In 1851 Kotsotekas, having returned to the security at their rear, spread through Coahuila end Durango states and the bordering areas of Sonora and Sinaloa without hunting Apaches. Tabe-tuhka returned to Chihuahua leading 400 warriors. few Mow-way brought thousands of horses and cattle to Texas. In 1852 the Chihuahuan Kotsotekas gained 18,000 Pesos for Apache scalps, but in July Tabe-tuhka's Kotsotekas clashed with Mexican cavalry south of Durango, and, soon after this, Tabe-tuhka was killed by the Apache, and Mow-way became the leader.

Fighting the Long Knives
Mow-way signed the Fort Cobb treaty in 1861 (along with Yamparika head chief Ten Bears, Nokoni head chief Quenah-evah (Eagle Drink), and second-ranking chief Horseback, and Penateka chiefs Tosahwi and Asa-havey). Several Comanche leaders met General Albert Pike (C.S.A.) and signed an allegiance with the Confederation. He signed the Medicine Lodge Treaty in October 1867.

On November 27, 1868, General Philip H. Sheridan's winter campaign led to the Washita Massacre. Lt. Col. George A. Custer's 7th Cavalry attacked and destroyed Motavato (Black Kettle)'s village, a Southern Cheyenne encampment on the Washita River in Oklahoma. The Kotsoteka and Big Red Meat's Nokoni band immediately intervened to help the Cheyenne. They fought and wiped out Major Joel Elliott's 7th U.S. Cavalry troop of 20 men. Andrew W. Evans' Canadian River campaigns between November - December 1868 against Kwahadi, Kotsoteka and Nokoni Comanche villages, forced Big Red Meat and Tahka's Nokoni, Mow-way's Kotsoteka, Parua-ocoom's (Bull Bear) Kwahadi to surrender.  In January 1869, Mow-way surrendered to Col. Benjamin Grierson.  Grierson turned Mow-way over to Lawrie Tatum, the new Quaker agent at Fort Sill. Mow-way and the Kotsoteka soon left Fort Sill to rejoin their Kwahadi allies on the Staked Plains.

After May 1871, Mow-way and his band were associated with the hostile Kwahadi band, perhaps due to his associations among the Nokoni  with old Horseback, as well as Peta Nocona (Lone Wanderer), Parra-ocoom (Bull Bear), Kobay-o-burra (Wild Horse), Kobay-o-toho (Black Horse) and Peta Nocona's son, Quanah Parker.

Red River attack 
Colonel Ranald Mackenzie's troops attacked Mow-way's village near the North Fork of the Red River in Gray County, Texas, on September 28, 1872.  That day: the 4th U.S. Cavalry under Mackenzie, attacked the Kotsotekas at Mow-way's village near McClellan Creek, while under subchief Kai-Wotche's leadership.  The "battle" was an unanticipated assu on the village with the easy killing of 23 men, women, and children and the capture of between 120 -130 (124) women and children and more than 1.000 horses. The Army had managed to catch the camp by surprise, and most of the village's inhabitants were captured. The Kwahadi warriors led by Parra-ocoom (Bull Bear), Kobay-oburra (Wild Horse) and Quanah Parker run from their encampments nearby and induced the soldiers to quickly retreat.

On the day after the attack, on September 29, the Kotsoteka and Kwahadi warriors attacked the military encampment and retrieved the horses, but not the women and children. The Comanche prisoners, 120-130 women and children, were kept under guard and were transferred to Fort Concho, where they were imprisoned throughout the winter.

Mackenzie used the captives as a bargaining tool to force the off-reservation Indians back to the reservation and to force the Indians to free white captives.

After the Red River battle. Mow-way and Parua-ocoom moved their bands to the vicinity of the Wichita Agency. The Nokoni peaceful chief, Horseback (Kiyou), who had family members among the prisoners, persuaded the Comanches to trade stolen livestock and white captives in exchange for the captured women and children. Mow-way placed his camp near the agency and remained there until the release of the captives.

Adobe Walls. Attack against buffalo hunters/Long Knives 
Together with Quanah Parker (son to Peta Nocona), Kobay-oburra (Wild Horse) as Kwahadi war chiefs Isa-rosa (White Wolf), Tabananika (Sunrise's Voice), Tuwikaa-tiesuat and Isananica (both of them sons to Ten Bears) as Yamparika leaders, Big Red-meat as the Nokoni militant chief, also Mow-way and his Kotsoteka band took part in the attack against the buffalo hunters at Adobe Walls on June 27, 1874. The Indians were overpowered due to the opponents' high powered rifles and skilled marksmen. After the attack, Mow-way and the Kotsotekas hid in the Palo Duro Canyon, with their Kwahadi and Nokoni kinsmen and their Kiowa and Southern Cheyenne allies. Mackenzie's scouts discovered the hostile Comanche, Kiowa and Southern Cheyenne encampments in Palo Duro Canyon and attacked them on September 27, 1874. The Red River War ensued, It ended in 1875 with the surrender of Mow-way and his fellow warriors at Fort Sill on April 28, 1875.

Death of Mow-way 
Mow-way died of pneumonia in 1886.

A portrait of Mow-way is included in the J. Paul Getty Museum.

References

Sources 
 
 
 
 
 
 

Comanche people
Texas–Indian Wars
Native American people of the Indian Wars
Battles involving the Comanche
Native American leaders
1820s births
1886 deaths
Year of birth unknown